Operation Hurricane is an annual month-long technical maintenance mission conducted by Canadian Forces personnel in the Canadian Arctic.

Each summer, since 1982, Canadian military technicians and support personnel have been deployed by helicopters to repair and resupply the otherwise unattended High Arctic Data Communications System (HADCS), between CFS Alert and Eureka, located on Ellesmere Island in Nunavut.

In 2005, military personnel also conducted a patrol, during which they raised a Canadian flag on Hans Island – a small, barren island in the Nares Strait, between northern Ellesmere Island and Greenland. Denmark disputed Canada's claim to this territory until 2022 when the countries agreed to split the island between both nations, ending a 17 year negotiation process.

See also
 List of Canadian military operations
 North Warning System
 Canadian Rangers

External links
 Canadian Forces

Hurricane
Northern Canada